The enzyme 3-phosphoglycerate phosphatase (EC 3.1.3.38) catalyzes the reaction 

D-glycerate 3-phosphate + H2O  D-glycerate + phosphate

This enzyme belongs to the family of hydrolases, specifically those acting on phosphoric monoester bonds.  The systematic name is D-glycerate-3-phosphate phosphohydrolase. Other names in common use include D-3-Phosphoglycerate phosphatase, and 3-PGA phosphatase.  This enzyme participates in  glycine, serine and threonine metabolism.

References

 

EC 3.1.3
Enzymes of unknown structure